KXRA-FM (92.3 FM, "KX92") is a classic rock music radio station in Alexandria, Minnesota, United States, owned by Leighton Broadcasting, which also owns KXRZ and KXRA.

An audio identification was recorded.

References

External links

Radio stations in Alexandria, Minnesota
Classic rock radio stations in the United States
Radio stations established in 1978